Jan Jonker Afrikaner (c. 1820 in Bethanie, South West Africa – 10 August 1889 near Tsoabis, South West Africa) was the second oldest son of Jonker Afrikaner and Beetje Boois. He became the sixth and last Captain of the Orlam Afrikaners in South West Africa, succeeding his brother Christian Afrikaner in 1863. He married Mietje Hendrik in Bethanie in December 1842.
 
The Orlams at that time were in constant conflict with the Herero over land and cattle but did not have the support of the European traders in Otjimbingwe, particularly Karl Johan Andersson and Frederick Green. They considered that the war was bad for trade, and helped organising and leading the Herero army. Consequently, the Herero were better equipped and gradually took over military dominance.

On 22 June 1864, there was a decisive battle in which Jan Jonker Afrikaner's forces were defeated by Maharero. He remained leader but the Afrikaner tribe lost their position of political dominance in the area that is today central Namibia. In December 1867 he had to flee to Walvis Bay after he unsuccessfully tried to attack Otjimbingwe. In November 1881 Jan Jonker, with his Witbooi allies, were defeated by the Ovaherero in the Battle of Osona. Jan Jonker fled to the Gamsberg area.

References

Notes

Bibliography
 

1820s births
1889 deaths
People from ǁKaras Region
Nama people
Namibian revolutionaries
Oorlam people